The Access to Health Records Act 1990 (c.23) is an Act of the Parliament of the United Kingdom which applies to people in England, Wales and Scotland.

In Scotland it entitles any person entitled to act on behalf of the patient, where the patient is incapable within the meaning of the Adults with Incapacity (Scotland) Act 2000.

Otherwise, it entitles the personal representative of deceased persons, or any person who may have a claim arising out of the patient’s death to apply for access to health records, and if necessary to an explanation of terms which are not intelligible without explanation.

All other access provisions were repealed on 1 March 2000 under the Data Protection Act 1998 which provided a right of access to all living persons to their personal data.

Access can be withheld if it would be likely to cause serious harm to the physical or mental health of anyone, or to identify anyone other than the patient.

Where a person has a claim arising from the death, access is limited to health records which are necessary for that claim.

References

Acts of the Parliament of the United Kingdom concerning healthcare
United Kingdom Acts of Parliament 1990
Medical records